The Asian narrow-headed softshell turtle (Chitra chitra) is a large species of softshell turtle in the family Trionychidae. The species is endemic to Southeast Asia.

Common names
Chitra chitra is also known commonly as Nutaphand's narrowhead softshell.

Description
C. chitra can reach a straight carapace length of 4.9 ft (1.5 m).

Geographic range
C. chitra is found in Indonesia, Malaysia, and Thailand.

Habitat
C. chitra inhabits freshwater rivers and their tributaries.

Reproduction
C. chitra is oviparous. Nutaphand (1986) reported that a large female laid over 100 eggs.

Subspecies
Two subspecies are recognized as being valid, including the nominotypical subspecies.
Chitra chitra chitra  – Malaysia, Thailand
Chitra chitra javanensis  – Java, Sumatra

References

Further reading
Nutaphand, Wirot (1986). "[Manlai, the world's largest soft-shelled turtle]" [Thai Zoological Magazine] 1 (4): [64-70]. (Chira chitra, new species). (in Thai).

External links

Chitra (genus)
Turtles of Asia
Critically endangered fauna of Asia
Reptiles described in 1986
Taxonomy articles created by Polbot
Reptiles of the Malay Peninsula
Reptiles of Thailand
Fauna of Sumatra